Sumerian Daemons is the sixth studio album by the Greek death metal band Septicflesh. It was released by Hammerheart Records in 2003. It was originally the band's final album before they disbanded later the same year, until they reformed in 2007.

The cover art for the album was a real background constructed in accordance with Spiros' instructions by a Greek FX team that usually works for films and advertisements, called the Alahouzos Bros.

The words "Demon resurrection passages from The Book of the Dead" and "Two hours since I've translated and spoken aloud the demon resurrection passages from The Book of the Dead" in "Unbeliever" (2:29-2:32 and 3:56-4:03) come from horror movie Evil Dead II.

Track listing

Personnel 
 Septic Flesh – production
 Seth/Spiros A. – bass, vocals, artwork
 Sotiris V. – guitar
 Christos A. – guitar, samplers, orchestration
 Akis K. – drums
 George Z. – keyboards
 Natalie Rassoulis – soprano
 Gore – backing vocals on "Unbeliever"
 Fredrik Nordström – production, engineering
 Patrik J. – sound engineering
 Hammerheart Records – executive production

References

2003 albums
Septicflesh albums
Albums with cover art by Spiros Antoniou
Albums produced by Fredrik Nordström
Hammerheart Records albums
Albums by Greek artists